Emily Mae Edgcombe (born 25 June 1999) is an English cricketer who currently plays for Somerset. An all-rounder, she plays as a right-handed batter and left-arm medium bowler. She has previously played for Cornwall, Devon and Western Storm.

Early life
Edgcombe was born on 25 June 1999 in Truro, Cornwall. She also works for the NHS.

Domestic career
Edgcombe made her county debut for in 2014, for Cornwall against Dorset, and took one wicket.  She moved to Devon ahead of the 2017 season, and achieved her Twenty20 high score in 2018, scoring 82 against Wiltshire. She captained Devon in the 2019 Women's Twenty20 Cup. 

In 2020, Edgcombe played for Western Storm in the Rachael Heyhoe Flint Trophy. She appeared in three matches, taking one wicket against Sunrisers. In 2021, she played three matches for Western Storm, all in the Charlotte Edwards Cup, taking one wicket.

She joined Somerset ahead of the 2022 Women's Twenty20 Cup. She was the side's joint-leading wicket-taker in the tournament, with 12 wickets at an average of 18.71.

References

External links

1999 births
Living people
Sportspeople from Truro
Cornwall women cricketers
Devon women cricketers
Somerset women cricketers
Western Storm cricketers